The 3rd Cornwall MRC Formula 1 Race was a motor race, run to Formula One rules, held on 30 May 1955 at the Davidstow Circuit, Cornwall. The race was run over 20 laps of the little circuit, and was won by British driver Leslie Marr in a Connaught Type B.

This was the third and last Formula One race to be held in Cornwall.

Results

† Collins entered a Maserati 250F but elected to race at Crystal Palace instead.

References

 Race results at www.silhouet.com 

Cornwall MRC Formula 1 Race
Cornwall MRC Formula 1 Race
1950s in Cornwall
Corn